Surs'ko-Mykhailivka, (Ukrainian: Сурсько-Михайлівка) is a large village in the Dnipro Raion of the Dnipropetrovsk Oblast of Ukraine. 

The village is located 32km (20 Miles) to the south-west of the city of Dnipro and 56km (35 Miles) north-west of the city of Zaporizhzhia. It is located at 70 metres above sea level.

It has an estimated population of 2,552, as of 2021 and has a postal code of 52411. Along with the rest of Ukraine, except Russian-occupied areas, the village follows Eastern European Time (UTC+2) and Eastern European Summer Time (UTC+3) in the summer.

References 

Villages in Dnipro Raion